Agua Nueva (Spanish for "New Water") is the debut album by Mexican pop singer, Cristian Castro. It was released on June 30, 1992. It was nominated for Grammy Award for Best Latin Pop Album in 1993.

Following Fonovisa's purchase by the Universal Music Group, the album was re-released in 1998 with a different track listing.

Track listing

Chart position

References

1992 debut albums
Cristian Castro albums
Fonovisa Records albums